Backus is a surname.

Backus may also refer to:

Places in the United States
Backusburg, Kentucky, an unincorporated community
Backusburg Mounds, an archeological site in Calloway County, Kentucky
Backus Beach, Michigan, an unincorporated community
Backus Township, Michigan
Backus Creek State Game Area
Backus, Minnesota, a city
Backus, West Virginia, an unincorporated community
Blennerhassett Island, West Virginia, originally known as Backus Island

Other uses 
William W. Backus Hospital, a community hospital in Norwich, Connecticut
Backus Water Motor Company of Newark, New Jersey, which produced an early split cycle engine
Backus and Johnston, a Peruvian brewery

See also
 Backus upscaling, calculating the effective elastic properties of geological layers in petrology